Poeciliopsis prolifica, or the blackstripe livebearer, is a species of small freshwater fish in the family Poeciliidae. It is endemic to Mexico. It is a viviparous species and the female can have several clutches of young developing internally at the same time, hence the specific name prolifica, from the Latin proles, "offspring" and ferax, "rich, fruitful" in reference to the great number of young produced.

Description
Adult males can be told from females by the presence of a gonopodium, an extended rod-shaped anal fin that acts as an intromittent organ to introduce sperm into the female during mating.

Distribution and habitat
The species is endemic to Mexico where it is only found on the eastern side of the Gulf of California, between the states of Sonora and Nayarit. Its habitat includes streams, brackish lagoons, estuaries and mangrove areas, with sand, mud or gravel bottoms.

Ecology
The diet consists of detritus, zooplankton and tiny arthropods. The family Poeciliidae is known for the fact that the young develop inside the mother. In the case of P. prolifica, the pericardial sac spreads to form a "belly sac" and a follicular placenta is formed inside. Up to five clutches of eggs at different stages of development can be growing in the ovary at the same time, and multiple births can occur more often than in related species that carry a single clutch at a time.

Status
Development is taking place along this coast with the loss of mangrove and other suitable habitat, and the International Union for Conservation of Nature has rated its conservation status as being "near threatened".

References

prolifica
Endemic fish of Mexico
Freshwater fish of Mexico
Fish described in 1960